That's Why God Made the Radio is the twenty-ninth studio album by American rock band the Beach Boys, released on June 5, 2012 on Capitol Records. Produced by Brian Wilson, the album was recorded to coincide with the band's 50th anniversary. It is their first studio album since 1996's Stars and Stripes Vol. 1, the first album to feature original material since Summer in Paradise in 1992, their first album to feature guitarist and backing vocalist David Marks since Little Deuce Coupe in 1963, and their first album since the 1998 death of co-founder Carl Wilson.

Preceded by the single "That's Why God Made the Radio", the album reached number 3 on the Billboard 200 and was their highest charting studio album of new material since 1965, placing them second all-time with longest span of top 10 albums at 49 years.

Background
Jim Peterik has said that the album's title came from a comment made by Brian in response to Peterik's description of an AM radio broadcast filtering through a car's oval speaker.

According to record producer Joe Thomas, Brian Wilson circa 2008 or 2010 inquired to him about demo tapes recorded during the sessions for Wilson's 1998 solo album Imagination which Thomas co-produced: "He called up and said I've got some ideas for some new Beach Boys songs, and I said, That’s great, and I pointed out to him that when we worked together several years ago he had the genesis of some other Beach Boys songs that he had never really wanted to put on any of his solo records. That he had isolated specifically for the Beach Boys. So he asked me to compile those and it was more than a few." The two proceeded to meet with Mike Love in Palm Springs, who then agreed to a collaboration.

In the late 2000s, reports began to circulate that the surviving members of the Beach Boys would reunite for a 50th Anniversary tour and album. Despite some uncertainty and initial denials, on December 16, 2011 it was announced that Brian Wilson, Mike Love, Al Jardine, Bruce Johnston and David Marks would reunite for a new album and The Beach Boys 50th Anniversary Reunion Tour. The studio reunion was kicked off by a remake of the band's 1968 single, "Do It Again", recorded earlier that May. The next day, the group recorded the album's opening track, "Think About the Days".

Composition
Wilson and Love discussed the upcoming album and tour in an interview on February 16, 2012. The duo said the album was halfway done with Wilson doing most of the writing and stating that all of the songs will flow into each other. Wilson considers the title track, "That's Why God Made the Radio", to be one of the group's best. The album ends with a Pet Sounds- and Smile-inspired suite. The suite, originally six tracks and dubbed the "Life Suite", ended up to be the final four tracks on the album: "Strange World", "From There to Back Again", "Pacific Coast Highway", and "Summer's Gone." One song, "I'd Go Anywhere", was left off as it was unfinished, along with a couple of other tracks. Thomas described the making:

Many of the songs were written in collaboration with Thomas, whose input sometimes included entire chord progressions. Classified as baroque pop, many of the songs have a considerable history: "That's Why God Made the Radio" was written by Brian Wilson, Jim Peterik, Joe Thomas and Larry Millas back in the late 1990s, and that "about 80 hours worth" of demo tapes were sourced from that period. "Spring Vacation" originated during Your Imagination and contained new lyrics by Love written reportedly in five minutes. The track "Summer's Gone" was originally meant to be the final song on the final Beach Boys album, and according to Thomas, the album's original title was Summer's Gone with the intention that it would be the final Beach Boys album. It was changed when Wilson decided he would like to record a follow-up. The song was written in reflection of his mother's death and the end of Carl's life, who died two months after their mother.  Whereas songs like "From There to Back Again", "Isn't It Time", "Beaches in Mind", "Shelter" and "The Private Life of Bill and Sue" were written for the new album. During the band's June 15, 2012 show, a slight revision of "Isn't It Time" was performed, with some lyrics altered and a different vocal arrangement for the song's bridge. These revisions later appeared on the song's single release. The song  "Daybreak Over the Ocean" was originally recorded in 1978 by Mike Love for his first, as yet unreleased solo album, First Love (and also re-recorded for his equally unreleased solo album of a few years ago, Mike Love Not War a.k.a. Unleash The Love: this is the version — with additional Beach Boys vocals — that appears on the album).

Thomas describes the two sides of the album as the "dark side" and the "sunny side", and also believed that it was important for a Beach Boys album to have a sunny side, catering to both "hardcore Brian Wilson fans" and "Beach Boys fans". For the album, Wilson is credited as the sole producer, a first for the group since 1977's Love You, while Love is credited as executive producer, and Thomas for "recording". Thomas explains his and Wilson's roles in production:

28 songs were written and recorded for the album. Al Jardine stated that Carl Wilson's voice would be featured on the new album. Jardine said he had a song Carl had sung on and recorded and it would be used on the new album, with the name of the song being "Waves of Love".  Jardine said he only wished there was a way to include Dennis Wilson as well. However, while pre-recorded segments from both Carl and Dennis Wilson are featured during concerts on the band's 50th Anniversary Tour, neither "Waves of Love" nor any vocals from Carl or Dennis are featured in the final version of the new album. Johnston contributed one song titled "She Believes in Love Again", a song he wrote in 1985 (and that was recorded by the band on that year's The Beach Boys); however, the song was not included on the final version of the new album. According to Johnston before its release, the album's track listing was determined by Capitol.

Release

Promotion
The first single from the album, "That's Why God Made the Radio", made its national radio debut April 25, 2012, on ESPN's Mike and Mike in the Morning. It was released to the band's YouTube channel later that same day, with accompanying lyrics. In addition, the song has been released and is now available as a single on digital outlets such as iTunes and Amazon. , the album's title track, "Isn't It Time", and "Summer's Gone" have been the only songs from the album to be performed live.

The band appeared on various television shows throughout the tour performing the song, including an hour-long performance and interview segment on the shopping channel QVC in which close to 20,000 copies of the album were sold. QVC gave away an exclusive eleven track greatest hits CD with the purchase of the album. The hits CD was not available anywhere else. On May 1, 2012, Walmart scheduled an exclusive limited edition 50th anniversary collection 'ZinePak, to include a 72-page magazine with rare photos and new interviews with the group, as well as an 11-song CD including the group's recent re-recording of "Do It Again".

Doin' It Again, an hour-long documentary that aired during the summer of 2012 on PBS, was released on DVD and Blu-ray August 28, 2012. The documentary features a new biography with new interviews of the current lineup, footage of the band recording the new album, and live performances from the 50th anniversary tour. In November 2012, a DVD and Blu-ray titled The Beach Boys Live in Concert: 50th Anniversary was released featuring a performance by the band from July 2012 in Phoenix, AZ. The release featured a heavily edited performance which was cut down to sixty minutes and only 21 of the 50 songs performed. There was also mention of plans to release a DVD of their performance at Red Rocks although nothing has been officially announced.

Critical reception

According to Bruce Johnston, the album's overall aesthetic compares to their 1970 album Sunflower. It received generally favorable reviews, and reviewers unanimously highlighted the album's four-song closing suite as its crowning moment, which Consequence of Sound called "a funeral dirge full of majesty" and The Guardian touted "the best thing Brian Wilson has put his name to in the last 30 years."

Some critics were disparaging of the other more upbeat and lighthearted tracks in comparison, and one reviewer accused the band of using Auto-Tune. Others accredited the album's low points specifically to Mike Love's contributions, as NOW Magazine wrote "Since 'Ronald Reagan-lite Love' thinks the Beach Boys’ best period was their most profitable, we get bankable early 60s simplicity and zero evidence that these guys were once the coolest, funniest, strangest guys in music." Beats Per Minute summarized, "The album as a whole isn't flawless, yet by sounding utterly enchanting during its climax it leaves a listener feeling genuinely touched."

In 2013, Mike Love said that he was disappointed with the album's direction. "I was hoping to get together with Brian on That's Why God Made the Radio, but a guy who was involved in the production of that album engineered it otherwise," Love explains, "I talked to Brian about a year before we even started doing any of the recording for [the album]. He and I talked about doing a project and he was excited about doing it, but it never came to fruition at all. It was given another direction—not by me and not by Brian but by others. We were supposed to be allowed to get together to write songs from scratch like we did in the '60s, but that was never to be."

Commercial performance
The album debuted at No. 3 in the US album charts and became the group's highest-charting album in 38 years—since 1974's compilation Endless Summer and highest-charting studio album since 1965's Summer Days (And Summer Nights!!). It also became the band's first US top 10 studio album since 1976's 15 Big Ones and the highest-debuting album of their entire career. The album made its debut in the UK charts at number 15 giving the group their highest studio album debut since 1971's Surf's Up.  The album debuted at number 15 on the Canadian Albums Chart.

Track listing

Compact disc and web release

Vinyl release

Bonus tracks

|}

Personnel
According to AllMusic and Craig Slowinski.

The Beach Boys
Al Jardine – vocals, whistle 
Bruce Johnston – vocals
Mike Love – vocals
David Marks – guitar, harmony and backing vocals 
Brian Wilson – vocals

Additional musicians
(track number in parentheses)

Recording personnel

Artwork
Lawrence Azerrad – graphic design
Guy Webster – photography

Charts

Weekly charts

Year-end charts

Notes

References

External links

2012 albums
The Beach Boys albums
Capitol Records albums
Albums produced by Brian Wilson
Soft rock albums by American artists